KWRT (1370 AM) is an American radio station broadcasting a True Country format. Licensed to Boonville, Missouri, United States, the station serves the Columbia, Missouri, area.  The station is currently owned by Billings Broadcasting LLC and features programming from Dial Global Networks and AP Radio.

References

External links

WRT
Country radio stations in the United States
Boonville, Missouri